Lim Jae-beom (Hangul: 임재범; born January 6, 1994), better known as Jay B (Hangul: 제이비; stylized in all caps), and formerly JB, is a South Korean singer, songwriter and actor. Lim is the leader of South Korean boy band group Got7, a member of boy band duo JJ Project and sub-unit Jus2, as well as part of R&B soul crew Offshore as Def.. He made his small-screen debut through the drama series Dream High 2 in 2012.

Biography 
Lim Jae-beom was born in Siheung, Gyeonggi Province, and grew up in Goyang. When he was seven, after watching g.o.d. perform, he developed the dream of becoming a singer. He started b-boying in his third year of middle school after failing a school test, dancing with friends at Ilsan, Paju, Boramae and Jeongbalsan station, and taking part in competitions. As a b-boy, he used the stage name Defsoul, taking Musiq Soulchild's "Just Friends" music video as inspiration. In 2009 he was scouted by JYP Entertainment at a b-boy competition: he was not interested in attending the audition, but his father pushed him to do so. He subsequently passed the open audition, winning first place with Jinyoung over  applicants. He became interested in musical composition and hip hop culture as a b-boy, but at the beginning of his idol training, he thought that learning to sing was meaningless, and concentrated only on dancing; however, after listening to D'Angelo, he started singing and composing his first songs.

Career

2011–2014: Debut and career beginnings
In 2011, Lim was cast in the role of Jang Woo-jae in the television drama Dream High 2, which began airing on January 30, 2012, on KBS for 16 episodes. In order not to be confused with singer Yim Jae-beom, he adopted the stage name of JB. In May 2012, he and fellow trainee Jinyoung debuted as the duo JJ Project with the single album Bounce. Their official music video for the title track "Bounce" was released on May 19.

On March 11, 2013, it was announced that he would be appearing as Seo Mi-joon on MBC's new drama When a Man Falls in Love. On January 16, 2014, the two members of JJ Project debuted as part of a seven-member boy band called Got7.

2015–2020: Solo activities and first photo exhibition

In 2015, he played the lead role in Dream Knight, a web drama, as a superhero version of himself, alongside his fellow Got7 members, featuring actress Song Ha-yoon as the female lead role.

In 2018, together with group mate Yugyeom, he participated in the art collaboration project Collaboran for carbonated mineral water brand Perrier with American multimedia artist Ben Jones. The creation process was later revealed through a reality show in May.

On March 5, 2019, he and Yugyeom debuted as Jus2, a sub-unit of Got7, with their EP Focus and its lead single "Focus on Me". On June 6, 2019, he attended the event for Saint Laurent 20SS Men's Collection in Los Angeles as a representative of Korea. In December 2019, he launched the JB Collection, a summer-themed clothing line in collaboration with Represent, which went on sale for two weeks and sold 35,940 items.

He also writes songs as Defsoul or Def., both for Got7 and the Offshore crew; with the latter, he released two compilation extended plays, Scene #1 on June 24, 2019, and Scene #2 on March 26, 2020. On April 13, 2020, he became the first male K-pop idol on the cover of a digital issue for American magazine Allure. As Def., he held his first photo exhibition named Alone on October 6–12, 2020, in Seoul.

2021: Departure from JYP Entertainment and SOMO:Fume
On January 19, 2021, following the expiration of his contract, he left JYP Entertainment. On February 20, 2021, with the release of Got7's single "Encore", he started using the new stage name Jay B. On May 11, 2021, it was announced that Jay B signed an exclusive contract with H1ghr Music, an international hip hop and R&B record label founded by Korean American musician Jay Park and long time Seattle affiliate Cha Cha Malone. Three days later, he made a debut as a solo artist by releasing his new single "Switch It Up" featuring rapper Sokodomo, which entered at number 12 on the Gaon Download Chart. The R&B track was self-written and self-composed by Lim with Jay Park and Cha Cha Malone, who also produced it. The lyrics of "Switch It Up" talk about love, while the title conveys that his life is going to change. On May 25, 2021, Lim made his debut on the Billboard R&B Digital Song Sales Chart at number six, becoming the first Korean soloist to debut on this chart. He also became the third Korean soloist to chart on Billboard R&B/Hip Hop Digital Song Sales Chart with "Switch It Up" entering at number 18.

On July 30, 2021, he became the first cover star for the launching of TMRW Magazine Korea. The 100-page magazine had been curated with Lim himself and featured an exclusive interview, photoshoot and his own film photographies. In August, he appeared on MBC's singing competition show King of Mask Singer as "Toad's House" on episode 319. On August 26, 2021, his first EP, SOMO:Fume and the music video of the title track "B.T.W (Feat. Jay Park)" were released both digitally and physically. As part of the album promotions, Jay B held his first solo global fan meeting, "SOMO:Fume, Style of My Own:Fume", on September 25 through online platform Bbangya TV, while the official merchandise launched to commemorate the release of the EP, which went on sale for one week from September 2, was sold out in five days. An offline pop-up store selling additional items was subsequently opened in Seoul for two weeks from October 1, 2021.

In September, he also participated in "Feel the Rhythm of Korea 2", a promotional campaign sponsored by the Ministry of Culture, Sports and Tourism and the Korea Tourism Organization, for which he sang "I'm Surfin'", a re-interpretation of traditional song "Niliria", which was released on September 3 along a music video. On September 27, Jay B launched his second clothing line with Represent,  "Live Without Regrets", under his moniker Def. On October 18, he collaborated with Italian singer-songwriter and producer Fudasca on the single "Is It A Dream?", while in November, he starred in the new Adidas Originals winter campaign, "Open Spirit", along with Blackpink.

2022–present: Love., other music releases and world tour 

On January 26, 2022, Jay B released his first physical extended play as Def., Love., which was listed among the best albums and EPs of the first half of the year by Bandwagon, and named one of the best Korean hip hop and R&B albums of 2022 according to Rolling Stone India.

On June 18, 2022, he held the Nostalgic concert at Jangchung Arena to commemorate ten years since his debut: the event was followed by more than  people both online and offline. On July 25, 2022, the exclusive contract between Jay B and H1ghr Music expired and he signed with CDNZA Records. His first release under the new label was the single "Rocking Chair", which he first performed at the Nostalgic concert, and that was chosen by Bandwagon as one of the best songs of the year.

On September 21, Jay B released his third EP Be Yourself, and three days later kicked off the Tape: Press Pause World Tour in Seoul, which continued in Asia, Latin America and Europe for the rest of the year and will conclude in January 2023 with three encore performances in Bangkok and Seoul. On the occasion of the two Thai stops in October, which saw the singer performing in front of 24,000 spectators at a sold-out Impact Exhibition Hall, Jay B held a pop-up exhibition from October 17 to November 15 at the Siam Center, presenting ideas and inspirations behind the Be Yourself album. In the meantime, he released his fourth EP, once again as Def., which was titled Abandoned Love..

Personal life
Jay B was diagnosed with clinical depression as well as panic disorder, and has since taken prescribed medication for them.

During his younger years, his parents divorced due to his father's drinking problem, and his mother later remarried. His family runs a tomato farm in Ilsan.

On September 12, 2014, he was involved in a minor car accident while the driver was trying to change lanes to avoid a parked car when a bus came up behind, causing their car to hit a van. Neither Jay B nor his staff suffered major injuries. In 2016, he was unable to participate in several Got7's Fly Tour concerts and a M!Countdown performance due to a spinal disc injury. He returned for the Fly in Singapore concert at the Suntec Singapore Convention & Exhibition Centre on June 24, showing a full recovery.

Jay B majored in film at Konkuk University.

In February 2023 it was reported that he was serving as a public service worker for his mandatory military service.

Philanthropy
On November 24, 2017, it was revealed that he had donated  to the Pohang Earthquake Relief Fund under his real name. On February 27, 2020, he donated  to the Hope Bridge Disaster Relief Association in light of the COVID-19 pandemic.

After being appointed an ambassador for ChildFund Korea (Green Umbrella Children's Foundation) in 2018, Jay B has continued to donate to the organization over the years to help underprivileged children. In 2021 he donated the profits from the sales of his SOMO:Fume merchandise and his Def. Represent collection to support families in need caused by COVID-19 and abused children, reaching  and thus being appointed as an official member of the Green Noble Club in December.

On January 18, 2022, he donated  for the Goyang Love Sharing Hope campaign to establish an emergency support system for gaps in welfare in Goyang. On February 10, 2023, the Green Umbrella Children's Foundation announced that he had donated  to help children around the world and that the donation would be used mainly for the victims of the 2023 Turkey–Syria earthquake.

Discography

Extended plays

Mixtapes

Singles

Songwriting credits

Filmography

Dramas

Television shows

Web shows

Radio shows

Music videos

Awards and nominations

Notes

References

External links

 
 
 

1994 births
Living people
Got7 members
JYP Entertainment artists
K-pop singers
Konkuk University alumni
People from Siheung
South Korean male dancers
South Korean male idols
South Korean male pop singers
South Korean male singer-songwriters
South Korean male television actors
South Korean male models
South Korean record producers